Shawn M. Heaphy (born November 27, 1968) is a Canadian former professional ice hockey centre who played in one National Hockey League game for the Calgary Flames during the 1992–93 NHL season. His sole game was played against the Tampa Bay Lightning, where he failed to register a point, but was credited with two shots on goal.

Before the NHL, Heaphy played for the Michigan State Spartans. After his one-game stint in the NHL, he played in various leagues, including stops in the Italian League, Swiss Leagues, the 2nd German League, the IHL, and the AHL.

See also
List of players who played only one game in the NHL

External links

1968 births
Living people
Calgary Flames draft picks
Calgary Flames players
Canadian ice hockey centres
Fresno Falcons players
Ice hockey people from Ontario
Las Vegas Flash players
Las Vegas Thunder players
Michigan State Spartans men's ice hockey players
National Hockey League supplemental draft picks
Prince Edward Island Senators players
Salt Lake Golden Eagles (IHL) players
Sportspeople from Greater Sudbury
Worcester IceCats players
Canadian expatriate ice hockey players in the United States